Olivija Baleišytė (born 3 September 1998) is a Lithuanian road and track cyclist, who currently rides for UCI Women's Continental Team . Representing Lithuania at international competitions, Baleišytė competed at the 2016 UEC European Track Championships in the elimination race and individual pursuit events. In 2020 Baleišytė was awarded the Lithuanian Cycling Federation title for Lithuanian female cyclist of the year.

Major results

2015
Panevezys Track Championships
1st Omnium (Juniors)
1st Points race (Juniors)
Minsk Track Championships
1st Scratch rave (Juniors)
1st Points race (Juniors)
European Junior Track Championships
3rd Individual Pursuit

2016
European Junior Track Championships
1st  Individual pursuit
2nd Omnium
2nd Points race, Prova Internacional de Anadia
2nd Omnium, Grand Prix Galichyna

2017
National Track Championships
1st  Omnium
1st  Individual pursuit
1st  Elimination race
1st  Points race
2nd Keirin
3rd Team sprint
3rd Sprint race
Grand Prix of Tula
1st Omnium
1st Scratch Race
3rd Points Race
3rd Omnium, International track race - Panevežys

2018
National Track Championships
1st  Omnium
1st  Scratch race
1st  Elimination race
1st  Points race
1st  Individual pursuit
2nd Keirin
2nd Scratch race
2nd Time Trial, National Road Championships

2019
National Track Championships
1st  Omnium
1st  Scratch race
1st  Elimination race
1st  Individual pursuit
2nd Points race

References

External links

1998 births
Living people
Lithuanian female cyclists
Lithuanian track cyclists
Place of birth missing (living people)
Cyclists at the 2020 Summer Olympics
Olympic cyclists of Lithuania